Chandrakant Lahariya is an Indian medical doctor, public health & policy expert and writer.  

Lahariya is the  author of book Till We Win: India's Fight Against The COVID-19 Pandemic.  

In early 2008, Lahariya had joined the World Health Organization in India, where – in the years which followed- he coordinated the organization's work on the new vaccines introduction in the country.

Awards and recognitions
In the year 2012, he received Indian Council of Medical Research’s Dr B.C. Srivastava Foundation Award for his work on translating community-based health research into public policy interventions.  

In October 2020, in a study conducted by Stanford University and published in the reputed PLoS Biology, Lahariya was listed amongst in top 2% of researchers globally, in the fields of pediatrics and public health. He was, once again, included in the list of Top 2% researcher globally, in 2021.

Books and writing
Lahariya is the  author of book Till We Win: India's Fight Against The COVID-19 Pandemic, with Randeep Guleria of AIIMS, New Delhi and Gagandeep Kang of Christian Medical College, Vellore. 

In 2009-10, Lahariya was the Guest editor (along with Dr Vinod Kumar Paul, the then Professor of [[Pediatrics]] at AIIMS, New Delhi  and now the Member, NITI Aayog, Govt. of India) of a special series on Child Survival in India. This series was published in the Indian Journal of Pediatrics and had contribution from leading Indian health experts including Prema Ramachandran, Deoki Nandan, Prasanna K Hota, & Shiv Lal. Lahariya had co-authored a few articles including one with Dr Vinod Kumar Paul of NITI Aayog.

Selected publications

References

Indian columnists
21st-century Indian medical doctors
Indian epidemiologists
Indian writers by century
Living people
Year of birth missing (living people)